Abu Al-Khaseeb (sometimes spelled Abu Al-Khasib) is a town in Abu Al-Khaseeb District, Basra Governorate, southern Iraq. Its name means "The rich area - agricultural", referring to the fertile Shatt Al-Arab river. It is an agricultural town, well known for its date palm farms on the river. Its population is predominantly Shia Arab. Abu Al-Khaseeb has long been a traditional center for boat-building of the mashoof canoes that are widely used by the Marsh Arabs.

References

Populated places in Basra Province
District capitals of Iraq
Port cities and towns in Iraq